Hemi Pititi Huata (c.1867–13 October 1954) was a New Zealand tribal leader and Anglican clergyman. Of Māori descent, he identified with the Ngati Kahungunu iwi. He was born in Ramoto, Gisborne District, New Zealand on c.1867.

References

1867 births
1954 deaths
New Zealand Anglican priests
People from the Gisborne District
Ngāti Kahungunu people
New Zealand Māori religious leaders
People educated at Te Aute College